Khánh Hòa is a  commune in the U Minh district of Cà Mau Province, Vietnam. As of 2007 the commune had a population of 17,854 and covers an area of 155.93 square kilometers.

The commune consist of 8 villages. Marine transportation is prevalent in the area. Industry is based around fishing, notably crabs, and blue shrimp.

Communes of Cà Mau province
Populated places in Cà Mau province